Raffaele Longo (born 6 September 1977 in Naples) is a retired Italian footballer turned coach, currently in charge as caretaker of Padova.

Playing career
A midfielder, Longo started his career with hometown club Napoli, making his debut in the 1994–95 Serie A season under head coach Vujadin Boškov. He left Napoli for Parma in 1998 and then Vicenza in 2000, and later went on to a career in the minor leagues of professional football.

With the Italy Olympic team, he won the 1997 Mediterranean Games on home soil.

Coaching career
After retiring as a player, Longo took on a coaching career, first as a technical collaborator to Cristiano Bergodi at Modena and Brescia and then as a youth coach at Bari.

In 2019, Longo joined Padova's coaching staff. On 21 February 2022, following the dismissal of head coach Massimo Pavanel, he was appointed caretaker in charge of the first team. After having been in charge for a 1–1 home draw against Legnago, he left his caretaker role on 24 February following the announcement of Massimo Oddo as the new manager.

References

External links
genoacfc.it 
FIGC 

1977 births
Living people
Italian footballers
Italy youth international footballers
Italy under-21 international footballers
S.S.C. Napoli players
Parma Calcio 1913 players
L.R. Vicenza players
Palermo F.C. players
ACF Fiorentina players
Torino F.C. players
A.S. Roma players
Genoa C.F.C. players
U.S. Salernitana 1919 players
Modena F.C. players
Benevento Calcio players
UEFA Cup winning players
Serie A players
Serie B players
Serie C players
Association football defenders
Footballers from Naples
Mediterranean Games gold medalists for Italy
Mediterranean Games medalists in football
Competitors at the 1997 Mediterranean Games
Calcio Padova managers
Italian football managers
Serie C managers